Yanka Industries, Inc., doing business as MasterClass, is an American online education subscription platform on which students can access tutorials and lectures pre-recorded by experts in various fields.

The concept for MasterClass was conceived by David Rogier and developed with Aaron Rasmussen.

History
MasterClass was founded by David Rogier while a student at Stanford University, originally under the name "Yanka Industries". Rogier, who continues to serve as chief executive officer (CEO), asked Aaron Rasmussen to join the company as a co-founder and chief technology officer; Rasmussen would also serve as creative director, before leaving in January 2017. The website launched under the MasterClass name on May 12, 2015.

MasterClass launched in 2015 with three instructors, and twelve classes were added in 2017. In late 2017, an acting class given by Kevin Spacey was removed after multiple sexual assault allegations were publicly made against the actor. By late 2018 MasterClass had about 50 classes and 1,000 lessons. Support for mobile devices was first added in April 2018. MasterClass hired David Schriber as chief marketing officer in June 2019.

MasterClass was started with $4.5 million in initial funding and two seed-funding rounds totaling $1.9 million. This was followed by $15 million in funding announced in 2016, $35 million in 2017, and $80 million in 2018. In May 2020, MasterClass raised $100 million in a Series E funding round led by Fidelity Investments, bringing total funding to approximately $240 million.

In May 2021, the company received $225 million in a Series F round, giving it a $2.75 billion valuation according to CNBC reporting.

In June 2022, the company laid off 20% of its staff, citing the worsening macroeconomic environment.

Classes
MasterClass produces online classes with well-known instructors in their field of expertise. Classes cover topics like writing, sports, and cooking. As of 2019, the company was expanding into politics, economics, and video game design. Many instructors do live demonstrations if the topic is easy to illustrate visually, while writers lecture.

The courses are available through an annual subscription. The classes are typically not interactive, though at least one course included interactive assignments where the student acted with other students, either in person or over Skype.

Reception 
Reviewers have noted that some of the courses, such as those related to the performing arts, require that students already have some basic proficiency. The courses were also noted for their high production values, and for inspiring students to continue to pursue the subject matter. Exposure to popular celebrities was also reported as a benefit. The Verge noted that while the subscriptions initially lasted a lifetime, different courses have different replay value.  The publication also noted the challenge of keeping students on the site to take additional classes.

In 2019, chef Dominique Ansel's MasterClass on French pastries received a James Beard Foundation Broadcast Media Award in the Online Video, Fixed Location and/or Instructional category.

In 2020, MasterClass won two Webby Awards, for Education & Reference in the Apps, Mobile & Voice category, and for Media Streaming in the Web category.

In 2021, MasterClass again won two Webby Awards, as well as a Webby People's Voice Award.

Notable instructors 
Notable past and present instructors include:

 Aaron Sorkin
 Alice Waters
 Alicia Keys
 Amy Tan
 Anna Wintour
 Annie Leibovitz
 Armin van Buuren
 Bill Clinton
 Bob Iger
 Bobbi Brown
 Brandon McMillan
 Carlos Santana
 Christina Aguilera
 Christopher Voss
 Condoleezza Rice
 Cornel West
 Daniel Negreanu
 David Axelrod
 David Lynch
 Deadmau5
 Diane von Fürstenberg
 Dominique Ansel
 Doris Kearns Goodwin
 Es Devlin
 Frank Gehry
 Futura 
 Garry Kasparov
 George W. Bush
 Gordon Ramsay
 Hans Zimmer
 Helen Mirren
 Herbie Hancock
 Hillary Clinton
 James Cameron
 James Patterson
 James Suckling
 Jane Goodall
 Jimmy Chin
 Jodie Foster
 Jon Kabat-Zinn
 Joyce Carol Oates
 Judd Apatow
 Karl Rove
 Kelly Wearstler
 Ken Burns
 LeVar Burton
 Lewis Hamilton
 Lynnette Marrero
 Madeleine Albright
 Madhur Jaffrey
 Malcolm Gladwell
 Margaret Atwood
 Mariah Carey
 Martin Scorsese
 Massimo Bottura
 Michael Pollan
 Michael W. Twitty
 Misty Copeland
 Nancy Cartwright
 Natalie Portman
 Neil deGrasse Tyson
 Neil Gaiman
 Penn & Teller
 Phil Ivey
 Pinky and the Brain
 Reba McEntire
 Ringo Starr
 Ron Howard
 Ron Finley
 RuPaul
 Samuel L. Jackson
 Sara Blakely
 Serena Williams
 Sheila E.
 Shonda Rhimes
 Spike Lee
 Stephen Curry
 Steve Martin
 St. Vincent
 Tan France
 Terence Tao
 Thomas Keller
 Timbaland
 Tom Morello
 Tony Hawk
 Usher
 Werner Herzog
 Yotam Ottolenghi
 Yo-Yo Ma

References

External links

American educational websites
Education companies established in 2015
Internet properties established in 2015
Subscription services